The Deer Island Waste Water Treatment Plant (also known as Deer Island Sewage Treatment Plant) is located on Deer Island, one of the Boston Harbor Islands in Boston Harbor. The plant is operated by the Massachusetts Water Resources Authority (MWRA) and began partial operations in 1995. The facility was fully operational in 2000 with the completion of the outfall tunnel.

Deer Island is the second largest sewage treatment plant in the United States. The plant is a key part of the program to protect Boston Harbor from pollution from sewer systems in eastern Massachusetts, mandated by a 1984 federal court ruling by Judge Paul G. Garrity, in a case brought under the Clean Water Act.

From the 1880s until 1991, the northeastern side of the island was the location of the Deer Island Prison.

History
The first sanitary sewer system for the Boston area, serving eighteen cities and towns, opened in 1884. It collected raw sewage on Moon Island in the harbor, and discharged it 500 feet off shore, with the ebbing tide.

In 1889, the Metropolitan Sewerage District was established. Over the next fifteen years, the agency built one of the finest regional sewerage systems in the country, although it still discharged the raw sewage into the ocean.

By 1940 there were three points, on Nut, Deer, and Moon islands, for the discharge of raw sewage into the Atlantic Ocean. This sewage had contaminated the shellfish beds to the point that discussions of building treatment plants began. The Nut Island plant opened in 1951. The Deer Island plant opened in 1968, and the Moon Island plant was converted to standby, overflow, operation.

The Metropolitan Sewerage District was reorganized into the MWRA, a larger agency, in 1985. Under the federal court order, MWRA completely rebuilt the treatment system between 1985 and 2000. Subsequently, all sewage is treated and the effluent is discharged at the sea floor  from shore.

In 2017, MWRA, Massport, the US Army Corps of Engineers, and Eversource reached a settlement to re-lay the Deer Island power cable that was blocking bigger ships from docking at Conley Terminal. The cable was  laid too shallow by Boston Edison across the Reserved Channel in Boston Harbor, violating its permit and blocking the Corps from dredging a deeper shipping channel. In August 2019, a new cable was energized, requiring Deer Island to run on backup power for a few days but adding a redundant fiber optic line from South Boston. Eversource paid $17.5 million to reimburse the remaining value of the existing cable, and MWRA sewer customers are paying $97.5 million for the re-laying.

Operation

Wastewater from the 43 communities in the Boston area served by the MWRA  reaches the plant through four tunnels. Three pump stations with a combined capacity of 1270 million gallons per day (mgd) lift the wastewater about 150 feet to primary treatment clarifiers that use gravity to remove about half of the pollutants. The next stage, secondary treatment, uses pure oxygen to activate microorganisms that consume organic matter. Deer Island cryogenically generates 130 to 220 tons of oxygen per day for this purpose. Sludge and scum from the primary and secondary treatment stages are thickened and fed to twelve 130 foot high egg-shaped digesters. Methane gas produced by the digestion process is burned to make steam which is fed to a turbine that generates about 3 megawatts of electricity and provides heat for the treatment processes and keeping buildings warm. (Additional on-site power is generated by two wind turbines.) Digested sludge is then sent across the harbor via a tunnel to a pelletizing plant at the Fore River Shipyard in Quincy. The output is sold as fertilizer and shipped to customers by rail and truck.

After secondary treatment, 85% of the pollutants in the waste stream have been removed. The stream is then treated with sodium hypochlorite to kill bacteria, and then with sodium bisulfite to remove the chlorine. The waste stream is then discharged into a 9.5-mile long, 24-foot diameter gravity-powered outfall tunnel that bores underneath the bay towards the ocean. It is one of the longest underwater tunnels in the world. In the last mile of the tunnel, 52 mushroom-shaped riser pipes carry treated effluent up from the tunnel to the ocean floor, where it is dispersed. Two divers died in an avoidable accident in the final phase of construction in 1999.

Before the new plant fully opened in 2000, the Deer Island plant had average flow capacity of 343 mgd (million gallons per day), and peak flow capacity of 848 mgd. The system had combined sewer overflows an average of 60 days per year, with a total of about 10 billion gallons per year of untreated sewage flowing into Boston Harbor. The new plant has a peak capacity of 1.2 billion gal/day, with average flows of 380 mgd, and no raw sewage discharges.

References

11. www.bostonglobe.com/magazine/2014/02/09/tragedy-beneath-boston-harbor-the-crime-scene-miles-below/uyUoaQWX3ybPhxyvqfO6EN/story.html%3foutputType=amp

External links
 "Boston Harbor Cleanup." Civil Engineering. (08857024) 72.11/12 (2002): 168. 25 June 2014.
 
 

Buildings and structures in Boston
Sewage treatment plants in Massachusetts
Water supply and sanitation in Massachusetts
1995 establishments in Massachusetts